Tej Pratap Singh Yadav (born 21 November 1987) is an Indian politician who was a Member of Parliament in the Indian Lok Sabha, where he has represented the Mainpuri, Uttar Pradesh from 2014 to 2019 as a member of the Samajwadi Party.

Early life and education
Tej Pratap Singh Yadav was born on 21 November 1987 in Saifai village of Etawah district to Ranvir Singh Yadav and Mridula Yadav. 

He studied at the Colonel Brown Cambridge School, Dehradun, and the Delhi Public School, Noida. He graduated with an MBA from the Leeds University Business School.

Family

His grandfather Ratan Singh Yadav, was the elder brother of Mulayam Singh Yadav. 

Hariom Yadav, the former MLA of Sirsaganj and Shikohabad is his maternal granduncle.

Career
He successfully contested a by-election to replace his granduncle, Mulayam Singh Yadav, as the Member of Parliament of the Mainpuri.

Positions held

Personal life
In 2015, Tej Pratap married Raj Lakshmi Yadav, the youngest daughter of Lalu Prasad Yadav. The couple had a child in 2016.

References

1987 births
Living people
People from Saifai
India MPs 2014–2019
Lok Sabha members from Uttar Pradesh
Yadav family of Uttar Pradesh
People from Mainpuri district
Alumni of the University of Leeds
Samajwadi Party politicians